Marco Antonio Ávila Lavanal (born 30 August 1977) is a Chilean politician and teacher who has served as Chile's Minister of Education since 11 March 2022.

He is openly gay.

References

External links
 

1977 births
Living people
21st-century Chilean politicians
Cardinal Silva Henríquez Catholic University alumni
Democratic Revolution politicians
Chilean LGBT politicians
Chilean gay men
Chilean Ministers of Education
Gay politicians